John Murphy may refer to:

Arts and entertainment
John Francis Murphy (1853–1921), American landscape painter
John Murphy (fiddle player) (1875–1955), Irish fiddle player
John Cullen Murphy (1919–2004), American illustrator
John Murphy (playwright) (1929–1998), Irish dramatist, author of The Country Boy
John Murphy (musician) (1959–2015), Australian drummer and multi-instrument musician
Kim Deal (a.k.a. Mrs. John Murphy, born 1961), American singer/songwriter
John Murphy (composer) (born 1965), British composer of film scores
John Murphy (voice actor) ( 2010s), English voice actor in The Little Prince
John Murphy ( 2010s), fictional character in The 100
John Murphy ( 2010s), fictional character in The Leftovers

Business and industry
John Murphy (bellfounder) (fl. 1837–1879), Irish bellfounder
John H. Murphy Sr. (1841–1922), African-American newspaper publisher
John Murphy (contractor) (1913–2009), British building contractor
John H. Murphy III (1916–2010), American publisher and newspaper executive
Joe Murphy (contractor) (John Murphy, 1917–2000), Irish civil engineering contractor
John Murphy (engineer) (born 1943), American inventor and computer engineer, credited with inventing ARCNET
John Murphy (branding consultant) (born 1946), British branding consultant, founder of Interbrand
John Murphy (technical analyst) ( 1960s–2000s), American financial market analyst

Military
John Murphy (priest) (1753–1798), Irish Roman Catholic priest and military leader in the Irish Rebellion of 1798 
John McLeod Murphy (1827–1871), U.S. Navy officer during the American Civil War
John Murphy (Saint Patrick's Battalion) ( 1846–1848), Irish soldier
John E. Murphy (1869–1941), United States Navy sailor and Medal of Honor recipient during the Spanish–American War
John Alphonsus Murphy (1881–1935), American Medal of Honor recipient

Politics and law

Australia
John Murphy (Queensland politician) (1820–1883), Australian politician, member of the Queensland Legislative Assembly
John Murphy (1821–1883), Australian politician, member of the New South Wales Legislative Assembly
John Murphy (Australian politician) (born 1950), Australian politician, member of the House of Representatives

Canada
John Joseph Murphy (Newfoundland MHA) (1849–1938), Canadian politician, member of the Newfoundland House of Assembly
John Joseph Murphy (1922–2010), Canadian politician, mayor of St. John's, Newfoundland
John Murphy (Canadian politician) (born 1937), Canadian politician, member of the Canadian House of Commons

U.S.
John Murphy (Alabama politician) (1786–1841), American politician, Governor of Alabama
John Luttrell Murphy (1842–1912), American jurist, Justice of the Territorial Montana Supreme Court 
John R. Murphy (1856–1932), American politician and attorney in Massachusetts 
John W. Murphy (Connecticut politician) (1878–1963), American politician, mayor of New Haven, Connecticut
John W. Murphy (Pennsylvania politician) (1902–1962), American congressman from Pennsylvania
John W. Murphy (Arizona politician), American lawyer and Attorney General of Arizona
John F. Murphy Sr. (1923–2011), American politician from Vermont
John Ellsworth Murphy (1925–1984), American lawyer and judge in Omaha, Nebraska
John M. Murphy (1926–2015), US Congressman from New York, implicated in Abscam
John F. Murphy (South Dakota politician) (1930–2003), American lawyer and politician from South Dakota
John F. Murphy (law professor) (1937–2021), American law professor at Villanova University
John Murphy (Texas politician) (born 1945), American politician, mayor pro tem of Richardson, Texas
John F. Murphy (JAG) ( 2000s), American lawyer, Chief Prosecutor of the Guantanamo Military Commissions

Elsewhere
John Murphy (Irish Parliamentary Party politician) (1870–1930), Irish politician, member of the UK Parliament for East Kerry
Jack Murphy (Irish politician) (1920–1984), Irish politician, TD Dublin South Central
John A. Murphy (1927–2022), Irish historian and senator from Cork

Religion
John Murphy (priest) (1753–1798), Irish Roman Catholic priest and military leader in the Irish Rebellion of 1798 
John James Murphy (1796–1883), Irish Roman Catholic priest
John Tuohill Murphy (1854–1926), Irish Roman Catholic priest
John Murphy (archbishop of Cardiff) (1905–1995), English Roman Catholic archbishop
John Murphy (bishop of Cork) (1772–1847), Irish Roman Catholic bishop

Sports

Association football (soccer)
John Murphy (footballer, born 1872) (1872–1924), English footballer
John Murphy (footballer, born 1886), Irish footballer for Bradford and Luton
John Murphy (footballer, born 1894) (1894–1921), Scottish footballer with Hamilton Academical, Bury, Rotherham County 
John Murphy (footballer, born 1898), Scottish footballer for Heart of Midlothian and Kilmarnock 
John Murphy (1900s footballer), English footballer for Stoke and Bradford
John Murphy (footballer, born 1942) (1942–2020), Scottish footballer
John Murphy (Scottish footballer) ( 1950s–1960s), Scottish footballer
John Murphy (footballer, born 1976), English footballer
John Murphy (soccer) (born 2000), American soccer player

Australian rules football
Johnny Murphy (footballer, born 1879) (1879–1950), Australian rules footballer
John P. Murphy (born 1945), Australian rules footballer at South Melbourne and Sturt
John Murphy (Australian rules footballer) (born 1949), Australian rules footballer for the Fitzroy Football Club

Baseball
John Murphy (pitcher) (1858–1905), American baseball pitcher
John Murphy (infielder) (1879–1949), American baseball infielder
Johnny Murphy (1908–1970), American baseball pitcher
John Ryan Murphy (born 1991), American baseball catcher

Other sports
John Murphy (Cork hurler) ( 1880s–1890s), Irish hurler
John Murphy (Offaly hurler) (born 1999), Irish hurler
Johnny Murphy (coach) (1891–1961), American basketball player-coach for the Rochester Centrals
John Murphy (athlete) (1895–1972), American high jumper
John Murphy (sport shooter) (1919–1997), Australian Olympic shooter
John Murphy (basketball) (1924–2003), American basketball player
John Murphy (Derry Gaelic footballer) (1925/1926–2009), Irish Gaelic footballer
Jack Murphy (American football) (John A. Murphy,  1932–2021), American college football coach for the Toledo Rockets
John Murphy (Down Gaelic footballer) (1948–2020) Irish Gaelic footballer, manager, coach and selector
John Murphy (swimmer) (born 1953), American Olympic gold medal swimmer
Johnny Murphy (hurler) (born 1954), Irish hurler
John Murphy (sportscaster) (born 1955), American football announcer for the Buffalo Bills
John Murphy (cyclist) (born 1984), American cyclist
Johne Murphy (born 1984), Irish rugby union player
Jonny Murphy (born 1992), Irish rugby union player

Others
John Benjamin Murphy (1857–1916), American surgeon, president of the American Medical Association
John Murphy (sanatorium operator) (1912–1977), American professional wrestler and sanatorium operator, nicknamed "Dropkick" and namesake of the band Dropkick Murphys
John Murphy (loyalist), loyalist from Belfast, Northern Ireland
John Murphy, architect in Australia, see John and Phyllis Murphy

See also
Jack Murphy (disambiguation)
Jon Murphy (disambiguation)